In architecture, a bay is the space between architectural elements, or a recess or compartment. The term bay comes from  Old French baie, meaning an opening or hole.


Examples 
 The spaces between posts, columns, or buttresses in the length of a building, the division in the widths being called aisles. This meaning also applies to overhead vaults (between ribs), in a building using a vaulted structural system. For example, the Gothic architecture period's Chartres Cathedral has a nave (main interior space) that is  "seven bays long."  Similarly in timber framing a bay is the space between posts in the transverse direction of the building and aisles run longitudinally.
 Where there are no columns or other divisions, and regularly-spaced windows, each window in a wall is counted as a bay. For example Mulberry Fields in Maryland US, a Georgian style building, is described as "5 bay by 2 bay", meaning "5 windows at the front and 2 windows at the sides".
 A recess in a wall, such as a bay window.
 A division of space such as an animal stall, sick bay, or bay platform.
 The space between joists or rafters, a joist bay or rafter bay.

East Asia
The Japanese ken and Korean kan are both bays themselves and measurements based upon their number and standard placement. Under the Joseon, Koreans were allocated a set number of bays in their residential architecture based upon their class.

See also

Architectural elements

References

Architectural elements
Windows
Arches and vaults
Building engineering